The relations between Estonia and the United States have been constant and strong since Estonia regained its independence in 1991. The United States and Estonia are allies and partners.

Both nations are members of the OECD, NATO and the United Nations.

History 

The United States recognized the Republic of Estonia de jure on July 28, 1922. The first Estonian diplomatic mission in the United States was opened in the same year when the U.S. Commissioner at Riga, Evan Young, was declared the American representative to the three Baltic States, at the rank of Minister. An embassy in Tallinn was opened on June 30, 1930, with Harry E. Carlson as Chargé d'affaires. Following the Soviet occupation in August 1940 the American Embassy was closed in September 1940. However, the US government never recognized the legitimacy of the Soviet Rule in Estonia (1940 to 1991), and continued recognizing Estonia's diplomatic mission in the US as the legal representative of the Republic of Estonia. The recognition of the legal continuity of the Republic of Estonia has been the cornerstone of Estonian-U.S. relations.

On September 2, 1991, US President George H. W. Bush recognized the restoration of Estonia's independence. The U.S. reopened its embassy in Tallinn on September 4, 1991. Relations between the two countries have since developed rapidly. In November 2006, President George W. Bush became the first sitting U.S. president to visit Estonia. During the visit, he announced the administration's intention to work with the U.S. Congress to make changes to the U.S. Visa Waiver Program, increasing security while facilitating entry for legitimate visitors and businesspeople from countries like Estonia.

President Barack Obama nominated Jeffrey D. Levine as ambassador to Estonia, and he was confirmed by the Senate on March 29, 2012. Ambassador Levine presented his credentials to Estonian President Toomas Hendrik Ilves on September 17, 2012. Mrs. Marina Kaljurand, in September 2011 replaced Mr. Väino Reinart who had been serving as Estonia's ambassador to the United States since September 2007. Estonia also is represented in the United States by a consulate general in New York, Sten Schwede; and 10 honorary consuls: Jaak Treiman in Los Angeles, Eric Harkna and Siim Soot in Chicago, Paul Aarne Raidna in Seattle, Larry Ruth in Lincoln, Harry Huge in Charleston, Michael Corey Chan in San Diego, Aadu Allpere in Atlanta, and Steve Chucri in Phoenix.

Principal U.S. officials in Estonia 

 Ambassador/Chargé d’Affaires - Brian Roraff 
 ODC Chief: Robert Padgett
 Defense Attaché: Povilas Strazdas
 Naval Attaché: CDR Albert Geis
 Assistant Legal Attaché: Michael Kolessar
 Management Officer: Teresa Rotunno
 Political/Economic Chief: John Spykerman
 Public Affairs Officer: Ed Dunn
 Regional Security Officer: Omar Facuse
 Consul: Carlo Boehm

Principal Estonian officials in US - embassy
 Ambassador - H.E. Mr. Jonatan Vseviov
 Deputy Chief of Mission - Sven Jurgenson
 Consul General - Mrs. Kairi Kunka

Resident diplomatic missions
 Estonia has an embassy in Washington, D.C. and consulates-general in New York City and San Francisco.
 United States has an embassy in Tallinn.

See also
Estonian Americans
Foreign relations of the United States
Foreign relations of Estonia
New York Estonian House
List of ambassadors of Estonia to the United States

References

Further reading
 Granquist, Mark A. "Estonian Americans." in Gale Encyclopedia of Multicultural America, edited by Thomas Riggs, (3rd ed., vol. 2, Gale, 2014), pp. 97-106. Online
 Kulu, H. and Tammaru, T. "Ethnic return migration from the East and the West: the case of Estonia in the 1990s", Europe-Asia Studies (2000) 52#2: 349�69.

 Tannberg, Kersti, and Tönu Parming. Aspects of Cultural Life: Sources for the Study of Estonians in America (New York: Estonian Learned Society in America, 1979).
 "Estonians" in Stephan Thernstrom, Ann Orlov and Oscar Handlin, eds. Harvard Encyclopedia of American Ethnic Groups (1980) Online
 Tammaru, Tiit, Kaja Kumer-Haukanõmm, and Kristi Anniste. "The formation and development of the Estonian diaspora." Journal of Ethnic and Migration Studies 36.7 (2010): 1157–1174. online

External links
 History of Estonia - U.S. relations

 
Bilateral relations of the United States
United States